Masse and Massé are French surnames that may refer to

Alfred Massé (1870–1951), French lawyer, journalist and politician
Arthur Massé (1894–1972), Canadian politician
Bill Masse (born 1966), American baseball outfielder
Bob Masse, Canadian artist 
Brian Masse (born 1968), Canadian politician
Carole Massé (born 1949), Canadian writer
Charles August Masse, 19th century American politician
Dany Massé (born 1988), Canadian ice hockey player 
Énemond Massé (1575–1646), French Jesuit missionary
Francis Masse (born 1948), French cartoonist 
Heather Masse, American alto singer
Henri Massé (1886–1969), French orientalist
Jean-Baptiste Masse (c. 1700–1757), French composer and violoncello player
John Massé (born 1969), American animator, voice over artist and producer
Julie Masse (born 1970), Canadian pop singer
Kylie Masse (born 1996), Canadian competition swimmer 
Manon Massé, Canadian politician 
Marcel Masse (1936–2014), Canadian politician
Marcel Massé (born 1940), Canadian politician
Papa Massé Fall (born 1985), Senegalese-born Bissau-Guinean football player and coach
Paul-André Massé, (1947–2019), Canadian politician
Pierre Massé (1898–1987), French economist, engineer, applied mathematician, and high government official
Victor Massé (born Félix-Marie Massé; 1822–1884), French composer

See also
Masse (disambiguation) – includes non-surname entries
Massie
Massee
Massay, a commune in the Cher department of France

French-language surnames